Carlos Manuel Quesada Boj (born 3 May 1985) is a Spanish footballer who plays for Crevillente Deportivo as a central defender.

Club career
Born in Crevillent, Province of Alicante, Quesada graduated from Elche CF's youth system, making his senior debut with their reserves in the 2004–05 season, in the Tercera División. On 12 February 2006 he played his first game as a professional, starting for the first team in a 0–1 Segunda División home loss against Levante UD.

Quesada spent the next ten years in the Segunda División B, representing Real Jaén, Orihuela CF, CD Guadalajara, CD Atlético Baleares, UCAM Murcia CF, CF Reus Deportiu and Burgos CF.

Club statistics

References

External links

1985 births
Living people
People from Crevillent
Sportspeople from the Province of Alicante
Spanish footballers
Footballers from the Valencian Community
Association football defenders
Segunda División players
Segunda División B players
Tercera División players
Divisiones Regionales de Fútbol players
Elche CF Ilicitano footballers
Elche CF players
Real Jaén footballers
Orihuela CF players
CD Guadalajara (Spain) footballers
CD Atlético Baleares footballers
UCAM Murcia CF players
CF Reus Deportiu players
Burgos CF footballers
Atlético Saguntino players
Crevillente Deportivo players
A.S.D. Mezzolara players
Spanish expatriate footballers
Expatriate footballers in Italy
Spanish expatriate sportspeople in Italy